Aldama may refer to:

Aldama (surname)
Aldama (plant), a genus of plants of the family Asteraceae

Places
Aldama Municipality, Chiapas
Aldama, Chiapas, central town in the municipality
Aldama Municipality, Chihuahua
Juan Aldama, Chihuahua, central town in the municipality
Aldama, Guanajuato
Aldama Municipality, Tamaulipas
Aldama, Tamaulipas, central town in the municipality

See also
Los Aldamas, Nuevo León
León de los Aldama, formal name of León, Guanajuato